Andrzej Alexiewicz (11 February 1917, Lwów, Poland – 11 July 1995) was a Polish mathematician, a disciple of the Lwow School of Mathematics. Alexiewicz was an expert at functional analysis and continued and edited the work of Stefan Banach.

See also

 Alexiewicz norm

External links
 Alexiewicz Biography
 Andrzej Alexiewicz (1917-1995), a biography by Julian Musielak and Witold Wnuk

1917 births
1995 deaths
Lwów School of Mathematics